Youpon Plantation, originally known as Mimosa and also known as the Mathews-Tait-Rutherford House, is a historic antebellum plantation house and complex near Canton Bend, Alabama, United States.  The three story Greek Revival-style plantation house was completed in 1848.  It was extensively recorded by the Historic American Buildings Survey in 1936 and 1937.  It was named for the Yaupon holly trees that were once a prominent feature of the front grounds.  Architectural historians at the Alabama Historical Commission consider it to be among the most notable of the "stately pillared houses" in Alabama.

History
Youpon was built for William T. Mathews under the direction of George Lynch, a contractor from Maryland. Mathews was a planter and local builder.  The property was purchased by the Frank Tait family around the turn of the 20th century.  It remained with descendants of the Taits until it was purchased by the Rutherford family in 1999.

Architecture

The plan features a fully raised brick basement floor that is topped by two stories of wood-frame construction. The ground floor originally contained servant spaces, with the formal rooms on the principal floor and bedrooms on the uppermost floor. The floor-plan is rectangular.

The facade is five bays wide and four bays deep, with central doorways crowned by fanlights on the first and second floors of the front.  The central three bays of the front facade are fronted by a monumental tetrastyle Doric portico, with a full-width cantilevered second floor balcony.  The Greek Revival portico was added after the completion of the main house, which was originally built in the Federal style.  The original octagonal detached kitchen was destroyed in a fire around 1900.  Another octagonal dependency, with a tent-like flared roof, was then moved and connected to the rear porch of the main house to serve as a kitchen.  The rear porch was enclosed in 1978.

Notes

References

Greek Revival houses in Alabama
Houses in Wilcox County, Alabama
Houses completed in 1848
Plantation houses in Alabama